The Minister of Public Works was a cabinet member in the Government of France.  Formerly known as "Ministre des Travaux Publics" (1830–1870), in 1870, it was largely subsumed by the position of Minister of Transportation.  Since the 1960s, the positions of Minister of Public Works has reappeared, often linked with Minister of Housing ("Logement").  It has also been linked to Minister of Transportation, Minister of Tourism, Minister of Territorial Development ("Aménagement du territoire") and Minister of the Sea.

Minister of Public Works ("Travaux Publics") (1830–1870)

Minister of Public Works

Between 25 October 1906 and 22 March 1913 the Ministry of Public Works was combined with the Ministry of Posts and Telegraphs to form the Ministry of Public Works, Posts and Telegraphs.
Posts and Telegraphs was then transferred to the Ministry of Commerce and Industry.
Ministers of public works after this included:

Minister of Public Works ("Equipement") (1966 - present)
 8 January 1966 – 28 April 1967 : Edgard Pisani (Ministre de l’Equipement et du Logement)
 28 April 1967 – 30 May 1968 : François-Xavier Ortoli (Ministre de l’Equipement et du Logement)
 31 May – 10 July 1968 : Robert Galley (Ministre de l’Equipement et du Logement)
 10 July 1968 – 5 July 1972 : Albin Chalandon (Ministre de l’Equipement et du Logement)
 5 July 1972 – 28 May 1974 : Olivier Guichard (Ministre de l'Equipement, du Logement et de l'Aménagement du Territoire; Aménagement du Territoire, de l'Equipement, du Logement et du Tourisme; Ministre d'Etat à l'Aménagement du Territoire, à l'Equipement et aux Transports)
 28 May 1974 – 25 August 1976 : Robert Galley (Ministre de l’Equipement)
 25 August 1976 – 26 September 1977 : Jean-Pierre Fourcade (Ministre de l’Equipement; Ministre de l’Equipement et de l’Aménagement du Territoire (27 March 1977))
 26 September 1977 – 21 May 1981 : Fernand Icart (Ministre de l’Equipement et de l’Aménagement du Territoire)
 21 May 1981 – 22 June 1981 : Louis Mermaz (Ministre de l’Equipement et des Transports)
 20 March 1986 – 10 May 1988 : Pierre Méhaignerie (Ministre de l'Equipement, du Logement, de l'Aménagement du Territoire et des Transports)
 10 May 1988 – 22 February 1989 : Maurice Faure (Ministre de l'Equipement, du Logement)
 22 February 1989 – 21 December 1990 : Michel Delebarre (Ministre de l'Equipement, du Logement, des Transports et de la Mer)
 21 December 1990 – 15 May 1991 : Louis Besson (Ministre délégué auprès du Ministre de l'Equipement, du Logement, des Transports et de la Mer)
 15 May 1991 – 2 April 1992 : Paul Quilès (Ministre de l'Equipement, du Logement, des Transports et de l'Espace)
 2 April 1992 – 29 March 1993 : Jean-Louis Bianco (Ministre de l'équipement, du logement et des transports)
 29 March 1993 – 18 May 1995 : Bernard Bosson (Ministre de l'équipement, des transports et du tourisme)
 18 May 1995 – 4 June 1997 : Bernard Pons (Ministre de l'Aménagement du Territoire, de l'Equipement et des Transports)
 4 June 1997 – 7 May 2002 : Jean-Claude Gayssot (Ministre de l'Equipement, des Transports et du Logement)
 7 May 2002 – 2 June 2005 : Gilles de Robien
 2 June 2005 – 2007  : Dominique Perben as Minister of Transportation, Public Works, Tourism and the Sea

 
Public works
1830 establishments in France